The fauna of Indonesia is characterised by high levels of biodiversity and endemicity due to its distribution over a vast tropical archipelago. Indonesia divides into two ecological regions; western Indonesia which is more influenced by Asian fauna, and the east which is more influenced by Australasian species.

The Wallace Line, around which lies the Wallacea transitional region, notionally divides the two regions. There is diverse range of ecosystems, including beaches, sand dunes, estuaries, mangroves, coral reefs, sea grass beds, coastal mudflats, tidal flats, algal beds, and small island ecosystems.

Environmental issues due to Indonesia's rapid industrialisation process and high population growth, have seen lower priority given to preserving ecosystems. Issues include illegal logging, with resulting deforestation, and a high level of urbanisation, air pollution, garbage management and waste water services also contributing to the forest deterioration.

Origin of Indonesian fauna

The origin of fauna in Indonesia was determined by geographical and geological events on the Asian continental landmass and the Australasian continental landmass (now Australia). The island of New Guinea is connected with the present Australian continent, formerly as part of the southern supercontinent Gondwana.

This supercontinent began to break up 140 million years ago, and the new Australia-New Guinea continent (previously known as Sahul) moved towards the equator. During this period, animals from New Guinea traveled to Australia and vice versa, creating many different species living in different ecosystems.

The influence of the Asian continental landmass, on the other hand, was the result of the reformation of the Laurasian supercontinent, which existed after the break-up of Rodinia around 1 billion years ago. Around 200 million years ago, Laurasia split up, forming the continents of Laurentia (now North America) and Eurasia. Due to fluctuating sea levels, mainland Eurasia was not separated completely from the western part of the Indonesian archipelago, allowing animals from the Eurasian mainland passage to the archipelago, and new species evolved.

In the nineteenth century, Alfred Russel Wallace proposed the idea of the Wallace Line, a notional line following deep water straits dividing the Indonesian archipelago into two regions, the mainland Asian zoogeographical region (Sundaland) and the Australasian-influenced  zoogeographical region (Wallacea). The line runs between Borneo and Sulawesi; and between Bali and Lombok. Although the distance from Bali to Lombok is a relatively short 35 kilometres, the fauna distribution is affected by the line. For example, a group of birds would refuse to cross even the smallest stretches of open water. A second line, lying east, known as Weber's Line, has also been proposed to separate between "transition species" and species of predominant Australian origin.

Sundaland

Sundaland includes Sumatra, Java, Borneo and the smaller surrounding islands, whose fauna share similar characteristics with the mainland Asian fauna. During the ice age, lower sea levels connected the Asian continent with the western Indonesian archipelago. This enabled animals from the Asian mainland to migrate over dry land to Sundaland.

As a result, large species such as tiger, elephant, rhinoceros, orangutan, and leopard exist in this region. Many of these species are now categorised as endangered. The Makassar Strait, between Borneo and Sulawesi, and the Lombok Strait, between Bali and Lombok, are the deep-water Wallace Line separators, marking the limit of the Sundaland region.

Mammals

Sundaland harbours 381 mammal species, of which 173 are endemic to this region. Three of orangutan species, Bornean orangutan (Pongo pygmaeus), Sumatran orangutan (P. abelii) and Tapanuli orangutan (P. tapanuliensis) are listed in the IUCN red lists.

Birds 
According to the Conservation International, a total of 771 different bird species are found in Sundaland. 146 of them are endemic to the region. Java and Bali have at least 20 endemic species, including the Bali starling (Leucopsar rothschildi) and the Javan plover (Charadrius javanicus).

Reptiles and amphibians 
449 species in 125 genera of reptiles are estimated to live in Sundaland. 249 species and 24 genera are endemic. Three reptile families are endemic to this region: Anomochilidae, Xenophidiidae and Lanthanotidae, the last represented by the Bornean earless monitor (Lanthanotus borneensis), a rare and little-known lizard. Around 242 species of amphibians in 41 genera live in this region. 172 species of them, including caecilians, and six genera are endemic.

Fish 
Around 1000 fish species are known to live in the rivers, lakes, and swamps of Sundaland. Borneo has about 430 species, with 164 of them considered endemic. Sumatra has 270 species, 42 of which are endemic. The golden arowana (Scleropages formosus) originates from this region. Around 200 new species of fish have been identified in the last ten years.

Wallacea

Wallacea represents the biogeographical transitional zone between Sundaland to the west and the Australasian zone to the east. It has not been directly connected to either region, due to the deep water straits at its borders, and so could only be colonised by over-water dispersal. This zone covers of about 338 494 km² land area in total, divided in multiple small islands.

Due to its distinct and varied geography this region contains many endemic and unique species of flora and fauna and has been divided into a number of distinct ecoregions; the mountain and lowland areas of Sulawesi, North Maluku, Buru and Seram in Maluku, the Lesser Sunda Islands (with Sumba a distinct ecoregion in its own right), Timor, and the islands in the Banda Sea.

Mammals 

Wallacea harbours a total of 223 native mammal species, including 124 bat species; 126 mammals are endemic to this region.

Birds 
650 bird species can be found in Wallacea, of which 265 species are endemic. Among the 235 genera represented, 26 of them are endemic. 16 genera are restricted to Sulawesi and its surrounding islands. Approximately 356 species, including 96 endemic bird species live on the island of Sulawesi. One of them is the maleo (Macrocephalon maleo), a bird currently seen as endangered and found entirely within the Wallacea.

Reptiles and amphibians

With 222 species, of which 99 are endemic, Wallacea has high reptile diversity. Among these are 118 lizard species, of which 60 are endemic; 98 snake species, of which 37 are endemic; five turtle species, two of them are endemic; and one crocodile species, the Indo-Pacific crocodile (Crocodylus porosus).

Three endemic genera of snake can be found only in this region: Calamorhabdium, Rabdion, and Cyclotyphlops. One of the most famous reptiles in the Wallacea is probably the Komodo dragon (Varanus komodoensis), known only from the islands of Komodo, Padar, Rinca, and the western end of Flores.

58 native species of amphibians can be found in Wallacea, of which 32 are endemic. These represent a fascinating combination of Indo-Malayan and Australasian frog elements.

Freshwater fishes 
There are about 310 species of fish recorded from the rivers and lakes of Wallacea, 75 species of them are endemic. Although little is still known about the fishes of the Moluccas and the Lesser Sunda Islands, 6 species are recorded as endemic. On Sulawesi, there are 69 known species, of which 53 are endemic. The Malili lakes in South Sulawesi, with its complex of deep lakes, rapids and rivers, have at least 15 endemic telmatherinid fishes, two of them representing endemic genera, three endemic Oryzias, two endemic halfbeaks, and seven endemic gobies.

Invertebrate 
There are about 82 species of birdwing butterflies recorded in Wallacea, 44 of them are endemic. 109 tiger beetle species are also recorded within this region, 79 of which are endemic. One of the most astonishing species is perhaps the world's largest bee (Chalicodoma pluto) in the northern Moluccas, an insect in which the females can grow up to four centimetres in length. This bee species nests communally in inhabited termite nests in lowland forest trees.

About 50 endemic molluscs, three endemic crab species, and a number of endemic shrimp species are also known from the Wallacea.

West Papua and Papua 

The fauna of this region comprises a huge diversity of mammals, reptiles, birds, fishes, invertebrates and amphibians, many species of which are of Australasian origin. Ecoregions here include; the mountains of Bird's Head Peninsula West Papua, the lowlands of West Papua and Papua, the Biak Islands, Yapen island, the lowlands of New Guinea's northern coast, the mountain ranges behind the northern coast, medium and high elevations of the New Guinea Highlands, the lowlands and the swamplands of the southern coast, and finally areas of mangrove swamp scattered around the coast.

Conservation

45% of Indonesia is uninhabited and covered by tropical forests, however, a high population growth and industrialisation, has affected the existence of fauna in Indonesia. The wildlife trade has had a detrimental effect on Indonesia's fauna, including rhinoceroses, orangutans, tigers, elephants, and certain species of amphibians.

Up to 95% of animals sold in markets are taken directly from the wild, rather than from captive breeding stock; and more than 20% of the animals died in transportation. As of 2003, The World Conservation Union lists as endangered 147 mammals, 114 birds, 91 fish and two invertebrate species.

Some habitats have been protected since the early 20th century firstly under Dutch Colonial law. Indonesia's first national parks were established in 1980, and in 2009 there were 50 declared national parks. Six of these are also World Heritage Sites and 3 are wetlands of international importance under the Ramsar convention.

Endangered primates
Around 40 primates of the 200 primate species in the world are found in Indonesian forests. Four Indonesian primates were included among the 25 most endangered primates in the world; they are the Sumatran orangutan (Pongo abelii), the Siau Island tarsier (Tarsius tumpara), the Javan slow loris (Nycticebus javanicus) and the pig-tailed langur (Simias concolor).

Extinct animals 
The Bali and Javan tiger populations were eradicated between the 1950s and 1970s.

See also

 List of Indonesian animal emblems
 List of Indonesian floral emblems
 List of mammals of Indonesia
 List of Indonesian birds
 Endemic birds of Indonesia
 List of Indonesian birds: non-passerines
 List of Indonesian birds: passerines
 Fauna of Borneo
 List of national parks of Indonesia
 Flora of Indonesia
 Geography of Indonesia

References

External links
 Seacology Indonesia Projects Seacology
 Assem J. van den, J. Bonne-Webster, (1964), New Guinea Culicidae, A synopsis of vectors, pests and common species, Zoologische Bijdragen, Vol. 6 P. 1-136 PDF
 Bruijning C.F.A. (1947), An account of the Blattidae (Orthoptera) from Celebes, the Moluccas, and new Guinea, Zoologische Mededelingen, Vol. 27 P. 205-252 PDF
 Chrysanthus Fr. (1971), Further notes on the spiders of New Guinea I (Argyopidae), Zoologische Verhandelingen, Vol. 113 P. 1-113 PDF
 Chrysanthus Fr. (1975), Further notes on the Spiders of new Guinea II (Araneae, Tetragnathidae, Theridiidae), Zoologische Verhandelingen, Vol. 140 P. 1-50 PDF
 Diakonoff A. (1983) Tortricidae From Atjeh, Northern Sumatra (Lepidoptera), Zoologische Verhandelingen, Vol. 204 p. 1–129 PDF
 Humes A.G. (1990) Synopsis of lichomolgid copepods (Poecilostomatoida) associated with soft corals (Alcyonacea) in the tropical Indo-Pacific, Zoologische Verhandelingen, Vol. 266 p. 1–201 PDF
 
 Massin C. (1999) Reef-dwelling Holothuroidea (Echinodermata) of the Spermonde Archipelago (South-West Sulawesi, Indonesia), Zoologische Verhandelingen Vol. 329 p. 1–144 PDF
 Renema W. (2003) Larger foraminifera on reefs around Bali (Indonesia), Zoologische Verhandelingen, Vol. 345 p. 337–366 PDF
 Renema W., B.W. Hoeksema, J.E. van Hinte (2001) Larger benthic foraminifera and their distribution patterns on the Spermonde shelf, South Sulawesi, Zoologische Verhandelingen, Vol. 334 p. 115–149 PDF
 Ris F. (1927) Odonaten von Sumatra, gesammelt von Edward Jacobson, Zoologische Mededelingen, Vol. 10 p. 1–49 PDF
 Tol J. van (1987) The Odonata of Sulawesi and Adjacent Islands. Parts 1 and 2, Zoologische Mededelingen, Vol. 61 p. 155–176 PDF
 Troelstra S.R., H.M. Jonkers, S. de Rijk (1996) Larger Foraminifera from the Spermonde Archipelago (Sulawesi, Indonesia) Scripta Geologica, Vol. 113 p. 93–120 PDF
 Vervoort W. (1995), Bibliography of Leptolida (non-Siphonophoran Hydrozoa, Cnidaria). Works published after 1910', Zoologische Verhandelingen, Vol. 301 P. 1-432 PDF